Aluminium arsenate is an inorganic compound with the formula . It is most commonly found as an octahydrate. It is a colourless solid that is produced by the reaction between sodium arsenate and a soluble aluminium salt. Aluminium arsenate occurs naturally as the mineral mansfieldite. Anhydrous form is known as an extremely rare, fumarolic mineral alarsite A synthetic hydrate of aluminium arsenate is produced by hydrothermal method. with the formulation .

Modification of aluminium orthoarsenate was carried out by heating different samples to different temperatures. Both amorphous and crystalline forms were obtained. The solubility product was determined to be 10−18.06 for aluminium arsenate hydrate of formula .
Like gallium arsenate and boron arsenate, it adopts the α-quartz-type structure. The high pressure form has a rutile-type structure in which aluminium and arsenic are six-coordinate.

References

Aluminium compounds
Arsenates